Itzan Escamilla Guerrero is a Spanish actor, known for his role as Samuel García in the Netflix series, Élite.

Filmography

Television

Film

Theatre

References

External links 
 

Spanish male film actors
Living people
21st-century Spanish male actors
1997 births